Anaerococcus nagyae is a bacterium from the family Peptoniphilaceae. It was first found in a blood culture from a patient with ischemia and influenza. The cells of Anaerococcus nagyae are arranged in pairs. Although it can weakly ferment mannose, studies has shown this anaerobic bacteria can not ferment glucose and raffinose. A. nagyae is resistant to colistin, but it is susceptible to vancomycin and kanamycin.

References

Bacteria described in 2017
Peptoniphilaceae